Engine power is the power that an engine can put out. It can be expressed in power units, most commonly kilowatt, pferdestärke (metric horsepower), or horsepower. In terms of internal combustion engines, the engine power usually describes the rated power, which is a power output that the engine can maintain over a long period of time according to a certain testing method, for example ISO 1585. In general though, an internal combustion engine has a power take-off shaft (the crankshaft), therefore, the rule for shaft power applies to internal combustion engines: Engine power is the product of the engine torque and the crankshaft's angular velocity.

Definition 

Power is the product of torque and angular velocity:

Let:

 Power in Watt (W)
 Torque in Newton-metre (N·m)
 Crankshaft speed per Second (s−1)
 Angular velocity = 

Power is then:

Note that  is per Second (s−1). If we want to use the common per Minute (min−1) instead, we have to divide  by 60:

Usage

Numerical value equations 

The approximate numerical value equations for engine power from torque and crankshaft speed are:

International unit system (SI) 

Let:

 Power in Kilowatt (kW)
 Torque in Newton-metre (N·m)
 Crankshaft speed per Minute (min−1)

Then:

Technical unit system (MKS) 

 Power in Pferdestärke (PS)
 Torque in Kilopondmetre (kp·m)
 Crankshaft speed per Minute (min−1)

Then:

Imperial/U.S. Customary unit system 

 Power in Horsepower (hp)
 Torque in Pound-force foot (lbf·ft)
 Crankshaft speed in Revolutions per Minute (rpm)

Then:

Example 

A diesel engine produces a torque  of 234 N·m at  4200 min−1, which is the engine's rated speed.

Let:

Then:

or using the numerical value equation:

The engine's rated power output is 103 kW.

Units

See also 

 List of production cars by power output

Bibliography

References

Mechanics
Power (physics)
Engines